Leon Köhler (born 7 August 1999) is a German racing driver who currently competes in the Nürburgring Endurance Series for Car Collection Motorsport.

Career

Karting 
Köhler started karting in 2007. In 2017 he became champion in the KZ2-class of the ADAC Kart Masters and the CIK-FIA Karting European Championship.

Formula 4 
In 2018 he made his single-seater debut in the Formula 4 UAE Championship where he won on debut. He won two of the three races he contested. Afterwards he joined Mücke Motorsport in the ADAC Formula 4 Championship. After scoring a single podium in the final race of the season at the Hockenheimring he classified 13th in the final standings.

GT Racing 
In 2019 Köhler made a switch to Porsche GT3 Cup racing. In 2019 he started in the Porsche Carrera Cup Germany while also making his first appearances in the Porsche Supercup as a guest driver. He then went on the win the 2019-20 Porsche Sprint Challenge Middle East with 5 wins.

In 2020 he scored his win in the Porsche Carrera Cup Germany at the Lausitzring and finished the championship in 3rd. He also contested his first full season in the Porsche Supercup with Lechner Racing Middle East.

In 2021 he once again finished 3rd in the Porsche Carrera Cup Germany after scoring wins at the Red Bull Ring and the Hockenheimring. In the Porsche Supercup he classified 5th. In that year Köhler also made his first appearance in the Porsche Carrera Cup North America together with MRS-GT Racing.

In 2022 he made his debut in the ADAC GT Masters for ID Racing. He drove in a Porsche 911 GT3 R together with Jaxon Evans. A week later he contested the 24 Hours of Nürburgring for Phoenix-IronForce Racing. Together with Timo Scheider, Luca Engstler and Jan-Erik Slooten he contested the Cup2-class in a Porsche 992 GT3 Cup. Köhler also joined Car Collection Motorsport in the Nürburgring Endurance Series and won in his second race.

Racing record

Career summary

Complete ADAC Formula 4 Championship results
(key) (Races in bold indicate pole position) (Races in italics indicate fastest lap)

Complete Deutsche Tourenwagen Masters results 
(key) (Races in bold indicate pole position) (Races in italics indicate fastest lap)

References

External links 

 Leon Köhler at DriverDB
 Official website

Living people
1999 births
German racing drivers
Racing drivers from Bavaria
ADAC Formula 4 drivers
Porsche Supercup drivers
ADAC GT Masters drivers
Nürburgring 24 Hours drivers
US Racing drivers
Mücke Motorsport drivers
Walter Lechner Racing drivers
Phoenix Racing drivers
Karting World Championship drivers
Deutsche Tourenwagen Masters drivers
UAE F4 Championship drivers
24H Series drivers
Porsche Carrera Cup Germany drivers